Rino Romano is a Canadian actor.

Career
He is known for his work as Batman in the animated series The Batman (2004–2008), Spider-Man in Spider-Man Unlimited (1999–2001), and the video games Spider-Man, Spider-Man 2: Enter Electro for PlayStation and an uncredited cameo in X2: Wolverine's Revenge, Eduardo Rivera in Extreme Ghostbusters, Luis Sera in Resident Evil 4, King Pen and Scorp in the Skylanders franchise, Carlos "Stunts" Rey in NASCAR Racers and the original Tuxedo Mask in the '90s English dub of the anime series Sailor Moon.

Between 2006 and 2021 Romano also provided voice narration for the PBS series Curious George, as well as previews on NBC, The WB, and The CW. He was also the narrator for the courtroom reality TV series Hot Bench (created by Judy Sheindlin, known for Judge Judy) from the show's beginning in 2014 until 2020.

Personal life
He dated fellow actress Kathryn Fiore in 1999.

In 2018, he sold his home in Hollywood Hills West, Los Angeles for $1.647 million.

Filmography

Film

Television

Video games

References

External links
 
 Interview with Rino Romano on Batman: YTB

Living people
Canadian expatriates in the United States
Canadian male film actors
Canadian male television actors
Canadian male video game actors
Canadian male voice actors
Canadian people of Italian descent
20th-century Canadian male actors
21st-century Canadian male actors
Year of birth missing (living people)